The 1928 North Dakota gubernatorial election was held on November 6, 1928. Republican nominee George F. Shafer defeated Democratic incumbent Walter Maddock with 56.50% of the vote.

Primary elections
Primary elections were held on June 27, 1928.

Democratic primary

Candidates
Fred L. Anderson
Charles K. Otto

Results

Republican primary

Candidates
George F. Shafer, North Dakota Attorney General
Thorstein H. H. Thoresen, North Dakota Tax Commissioner
Charles Streich

Results

General election

Candidates
Major party candidates
George F. Shafer, Republican
Walter Maddock, Democratic

Other candidates
K. P. Loesch, Farmer–Labor

Results

References

1928
North Dakota
Gubernatorial